Zirik (also, Zizik) is a village and municipality in the Qabala Rayon of Azerbaijan.  It has a population of 1,026.

References 

Populated places in Qabala District